Eero Kalervo Paloheimo (born 14 June 1936, in Helsinki) is a Finnish designer, politician and university professor.

Paloheimo was a Green Party representative in the Finnish Parliament from 1987 until 1995 and, during his final year in the Parliament, Chairman of the Committee of Long–Term Future Options. Paloheimo was also a professor for the Helsinki University of Technology from his resignation until the year 2000.

Eero Paloheimo has been engaged in ecological living for many years and is the founder and owner of Eero Paloheimo Ecocity Ltd. He is currently involved in the development of a new Finnish traffic system.

In 2015 Paloheimo and professor U.B. Lindström launched Unite The Armies -campaign, which aims to stop the deterioration of global environment and to set militaries a new mission to defend people against gradual disasters.

Education
Eero Paloheimo has both a Doctorate of Engineering from Technical University Munich and a Doctor of Philosophy from Helsinki.

Books 
Paloheimo has written several books and some have been translated into English.

 Tämä on Afrikka, (This is Africa), WSOY (2007)
 Struktuuri, (The Structure), Terra Cognita (2004)
 Megaevoluutio, (The Megaevolution), WSOY (2002)
 Syntymättömien sukupolvien Eurooppa, (The Way Towards a New Europe), WSOY (1996)
 Välit selviksi — ja joka suuntaan, (A Blow in All Directions), WSOY (1991)
 Maan tie, (The Earth’s Path), WSOY (1989)
  Maa, (The Earth), WSOY (1985)
 Suomi — mahdollinen maa, (Finland – a Possible Country), WSOY (1981)
 Maailma — alustava luonnos, (The World – a Preliminary Draft), WSOY (1977)

References

External links
 Eero Paloheimo's official website - 
 EPECC  Eero Paloheimo Ecocity Ltd
 Taiwan Architect 2006: 3rd Generation Ecocity 
 Unite the Armies. Save the planet. Give the armies a new, positive task: protect the environment. 
 Vihreä Elämänsuojeluliitto - The Green Association for the Protection of Life 

1936 births
Living people
Artists from Helsinki
Green League politicians
Members of the Parliament of Finland (1987–91)
Members of the Parliament of Finland (1991–95)
Technical University of Munich alumni